Felicia Yukiye Hano (born August 7, 1998) is a retired American artistic gymnast and trampolinist. She was a U.S. National team member in 2014, and was a member of the UCLA Bruins women's gymnastics team.

Career
In her career as a trampolinist, she won silver medals in the Tumbling and Double mini trampoline competitions at the World Age Group Championships. As an artistic gymnast, she qualified to the 2013 USA National Gymnastics Championships in Hartford, Connecticut. She completed one day of competition but withdrew on the final day due to a mild concussion. She attended San Gabriel High School. She joined the University of California, Los Angeles (UCLA) Gymnastics roster following high school.

Hano competed at the 2014 Secret U.S. Classic, her senior debut. She placed 10th, only competing three events.

After Hano's performance at the 2014 P&G national championships, she was originally not placed on the national team or the Senior Pan American team. After fellow American gymnast Alyssa Baumann declined her invitation to the Pan American team due to an elbow injury, Hano was put on both the Senior Pan American team, and the US national team.

On July 24, 2015, while at Podium Training for the 2015 Secret U.S. Classic, Hano was training a full-twisting Tsukahara on vault and she severely sprained her ankle, causing her to pull out of the competition and not being able to compete at the 2015 P&G Championships either.

Regular season ranking

Competitive history

NCAA

References

1998 births
American female artistic gymnasts
American female trampolinists
Living people
People from San Gabriel, California
UCLA Bruins women's gymnasts
U.S. women's national team gymnasts
NCAA gymnasts who have scored a perfect 10
21st-century American women